Zoran Kostić  (born 14 November 1982) is a Serbian football coach and a former player. He is the manager of Sloboda Užice.

Honours
Diósgyőr
Hungarian League Cup (1): 2013–14

External links
 Profile at FC-Ural.ru 
 Russian First Division Squads 2008
 Statistics at Sportbox.ru 
 Profile and stats at Srbijafudbal.
 Zoran Kostić Stats at Utakmica.rs
 Zoran Kostić "otplovio" u trenerske vode at presslider.rs

1982 births
Living people
Sportspeople from Čačak
Serbian footballers
Association football midfielders
FK Borac Čačak players
FC Shinnik Yaroslavl players
FC Ural Yekaterinburg players
FC Aktobe players
FC Zhetysu players
Diósgyőri VTK players
Nyíregyháza Spartacus FC players
Serbian SuperLiga players
Russian Premier League players
Nemzeti Bajnokság I players
Kazakhstan Premier League players
Serbian expatriate footballers
Expatriate footballers in Russia
Expatriate footballers in Kazakhstan
Expatriate footballers in Hungary
Serbian expatriate sportspeople in Russia
Serbian expatriate sportspeople in Kazakhstan
Serbian expatriate sportspeople in Hungary